Delhi Daredevils (DD) are a franchise cricket team based in Delhi, India, which plays in the Indian Premier League (IPL). They were one of the eight teams that competed in the 2014 Indian Premier League. They were captained by Kevin Pietersen. Delhi Daredevils finished eighth in the IPL and did not qualify for the Champions League T20.

IPL

Standings
Delhi Daredevils finished last in the league stage of IPL 2014.

Match log

Statistics

References

2014 Indian Premier League
Delhi Capitals seasons